The Syria women's national under-16 basketball team is the national basketball team of Syria for Junior Women, governed by the Syrian Basketball Federation.
It represents the country in international under-16, 17 women's basketball competitions.

The team participated in the FIBA Under-16 Women's Asian Championship for the first time in 2022, finishing second in the B division of the tournament after losing to Samoa in the final.

Current squad
Current roster for the 2022 FIBA U16 Women's Asian Championship Division B.

Tournament record

FIBA U-17 Women's World Cup
  2010 to  2022 : Did not qualify

FIBA U16 Women's Asian Championship

West Asian U16 Women's Championship

See also
Syria women's national basketball team
Syria women's national under-18 basketball team

References

u16
Women's national under-16 basketball teams